San Lino is a parish church and cardinal diaconate located in Rome on Via Cardinale Garampi 60 in the Primavalle quarter with the church's main entrance found on Via della Pineta Sacchetti. The church is dedicated to Pope Saint Linus.

The current Cardinal-Deacon for this church is Giovanni Angelo Becciu who is the second cardinal protector for the church since it became a diaconate in late 2007.

Background
On 22 February 1957, Cardinal Clemente Micara erected the parish in the decree Qua celeritate. It used a temporary location until a building was completed in 1999 according to the plans of architect Renato Costa. Cardinal Camillo Ruini dedicated the church on 23 September 1999 to Pope Saint Linus.

Pope Benedict XVI issued the papal bull Purpuratis Patribus on 24 November 2007 that made the church a cardinal diaconate and assigned the church its first cardinal-deacon, Giovanni Coppa.

Cardinal-Deacons
 Giovanni Coppa (24 November 2007 - 16 May 2016)
 Giovanni Angelo Becciu (28 June 2018 – present)

See also
Churches of Rome

References

External links

 Parish website
 Catholic Hierarchy

20th-century Roman Catholic church buildings in Italy
Roman Catholic churches completed in 1999
Lino
1957 establishments in Italy